Chase is the fifth extended play (EP) by South Korean boy group The Boyz. It was released on September 21, 2020 under Cre.ker Entertainment. It is available in three versions and contains six tracks, with "The Stealer" released as the lead single. 

Notable songwriters such as Andreas Öberg, Daniel "Obi" Klein, Charli Taft, and SM Entertainment songwriters and producers Kenzie, Jo Yoon-kyung, and Coach & Sendo contributed to the EP.

Background
The group's first comeback since winning Road to Kingdom was confirmed on August 17.

The comeback date was announced on September 7, along with teaser posters featuring the members. A promotional video titled "Breaking News" was released on September 9. The first batch of concept photos were released on September 10. A second batch of concept photos was released on September 12. The album's track list was released on September 13. On September 14, a second promotional video titled "The Stealers' Tricks" was released. A third batch of concept photos was released on September 15. The album's highlight medley was released on September 16.

A teaser for the music video was released on September 18, with the full music video released on September 21.

Track listing 
Credits adapted from Naver.

Charts

Weekly charts

Sales and streaming chart performance for songs in "The Stealer"

Certifications

Accolades

Release history

References 

2020 EPs
The Boyz (South Korean band) EPs